Ajay Ramaswami (born 7 June 1980) is a former Indian tennis player.

Playing career
Ramaswami has a career high ATP singles ranking of 569 achieved on 6 December 2004. He also has a career high ATP doubles ranking of 287 achieved on 25 April 2005.

Ramaswami made his ATP main draw debut at the 2002 Tata Open in the doubles draw partnering Srinath Prahlad after the pair received entry into the main draw as wildcards.

ATP Challenger and ITF Futures finals

Singles: 1 (0–1)

Doubles: 19 (13–6)

References

External links

1980 births
Living people
Indian male tennis players